Karl Miles LeCompte (May 25, 1887 – September 30, 1972) was a ten-term Republican U.S. Representative from south-central Iowa. He won ten consecutive races from 1938 to 1956, before choosing not to run again in 1958.

Born in Corydon, Iowa to Charles Francis and Hannah Miles LeCompte. LeCompte attended the public schools and graduated from the University of Iowa at Iowa City in 1909. One year later (in 1910) he became owner and publisher of the Corydon Times-Republican.  In 1916, at age 29, he won election to the Iowa Senate, becoming its youngest member. In 1918, during the First World War he served as a private in the medical detachment of United States General Hospital No. 26, but did not serve overseas. His service in the Senate ended in 1921.

When Republican U.S. Representative Lloyd Thurston ran for the U.S. Senate in 1938, LeCompte ran for his seat in Iowa's 5th congressional district. In a successful bid for the Republican nomination in the primary, his advertisements stressed that he was "inalterably opposed to the New Deal Program of waste and extravagance." In the general election, he defeated Albia, Iowa Postmaster Ruth F. Hollingshead, the first woman to run for Congress in Iowa, and began serving in 1939. In his first term, he served on the Committee on Public Lands and the Committee on Insular Affairs.  He was re-elected to his 5th district seat in 1940, before redistricting in 1941 retitled the same set of counties as Iowa's 4th congressional district. He was not seriously challenged until 1948, when attorney and Democrat Steven V. Carter first ran against LeCompte, and came within 4,000 votes of unseating LeCompte.  LeCompte easily prevailed in the next three elections before Carter again came within 2,000 votes of unseating him in 1956.  After the 1956 election, Carter filed a challenge against the result with the U.S. House, which decided two years later that LeCompte was properly declared the winner.
 
He served as chairman of the Committee on House Administration in the Eightieth Congress (from 1947 to 1948) and in the Eighty-third Congress (from 1953 to 1955).

Rather than running again in 1958, LeCompte retired, and Carter won the seat on his fourth attempt.  In all, LeCompte served in Congress between January 3, 1939, and January 3, 1959. LeCompte voted in favor of the Civil Rights Act of 1957.

After his last term in Congress, LeCompte returned to newspaper publishing. He later retired but continued as a contributing editor.

He died in Centerville, Iowa, on September 30, 1972. He was interred in Corydon Cemetery, Corydon, Iowa.

References

External links
 
 Karl Miles LeCompte Memorial Library at Corydon, Wayne County, Iowa

1887 births
1972 deaths
University of Iowa alumni
United States Army soldiers
People from Corydon, Iowa
Republican Party members of the United States House of Representatives from Iowa
20th-century American politicians